The 2019 Hertsmere Borough Council election took place on 2 May 2019 to elect members of the Hertsmere Borough Council in England. It was held on the same day as other local elections.

Summary

Election result

|-

Ward results

Aldenham East

Aldenham West

Bentley Heath & The Royds

Borehamwood Brookmeadow

Borehamwood Cowley Hill

Borehamwood Hillside

Borehamwood Kenilworth

Bushey Heath

Bushey North

Bushey Park

Bushey St. James

Elstree

Potters Bar Furzefield

Potters Bar Oakmere

Potters Bar Parkfield

Shenley

By-elections

Borehamwood Kenilworth

Borehamwood Kenilworth

Bushey North

References

2019 English local elections
May 2019 events in the United Kingdom
2019
2010s in Hertfordshire